This is a list of members of the 3rd Lok Sabha arranged by state or territory represented. These members of the lower house of the Indian Parliament were elected to the 3rd Lok Sabha at the 1962 Indian general election.

The official list of members, hosted on a site maintained by Government of India : http://www.elections.in/parliamentary-constituencies/1962-election-results.html

Andhra Pradesh

Assam

Bihar

Chandigarh

Delhi

Goa, Daman and Diu

Gujarat

Haryana

Himachal Pradesh

Jammu and Kashmir

Karnataka

Kerala

Madhya Pradesh

Madras State

Maharashtra

Manipur

Meghalaya

Mysore State

Nagaland

Odisha

Puducherry

Punjab

Rajasthan

Tamil Nadu

Tripura

Uttar Pradesh

West Bengal

References

List
3